, also shortened to , is a genre of music originating from Japanese pop music. Anime songs consist of theme, insert, and image songs for anime, manga, video game, and audio drama CD series, as well as any other song released primarily for the anime market, including music from Japanese voice actors.

The anime song genre was first defined as a musical category in the 1970s. It later gained popularity from the public when mainstream artists begin releasing songs as tie-ins for anime series. By the 1990s, it became redefined as a separate genre when companies began creating record labels that would exclusively produce anime songs for their series and artists. The increase in voice actors beginning in the mid 2000s led to growing market interest in the genre.

History

1930-1970: Early influences

The Dull Sword (1917), by Jun'ichi Kōuchi, is regarded as the earliest surviving animated film in Japan. Noburō Ōfuji's Kuroi Nyago (1929) is the first Japanese animated work to include music. The film includes characters dancing to a prerecorded song, retroactively seen as the prototype of anime songs.

Following World War II, the 1950s and 1960s saw a revival in entertainment and cultural development. In 1963, Astro Boy premiered and subsequently, the theme song "Theme of Astro Boy" became well-known to the Japanese public due to it being used as the departure song at Takadanobaba Station. The song was also notable due to the lyrics being written by poet Shuntarō Tanikawa.

1970-1980: Growing popularity of anime songs

Japan's economic growth in the 1970s led to more cultural development, and people who exclusively sang theme songs for anime were known as "anime song singers." Despite the lack of public appearances from the singers, theme songs from the series Mazinger Z, Space Battleship Yamato, and Candy Candy became known to the Japanese public, even outside of fans who watched the shows. At the same time, Mobile Suit Gundam voice actors Toshio Furukawa and Toru Furuya gained a large female fanbase with through Slapstick, a vocal unit consisting of voice actors from the show meant to its theme songs. While anime theme songs originally used the name and settings from the series of which they were based, this led to the lyrics of anime songs being centered on the characters' thoughts and feelings for more universal appeal and allowing for context outside of the original animated work.

1980-1990: Mainstream recognition

At the height of Japan's bubble economy, in the 1980s, musicians outside of the anime industry began performing theme songs for anime. In 1984, the single "Ai Oboete Imasu ka", which was released for Macross under the character Lynn Minmay's name, charted at #7 on the Oricon Weekly Singles Chart. Furthermore, Cat's Eye (1983) received widespread media attention for having Anri, a singer whose activities had no connection to the anime industry, perform its theme songs. Likewise, TM Network, a band who were active outside of the anime industry, received media attention when their 1987 song "Get Wild" was released as the theme song to City Hunter. As a result of the song's popularity, TM Network were invited to the 72nd Kohaku Uta Gassen to perform it. From then on, mainstream artists releasing tie-in songs for anime became common.

1990-2000: In-house production and modernization

Following the collapse of the bubble economy in Japan, labels exclusively dedicated to exclusively producing anime songs were formed, most notably King Records' Starchild label. This was in part due the "" phenomenon named after Being Inc., which gained a fanbase after their artists Zard and Maki Ohguro released songs that were well-received by the public. Yoko Takahashi, who was part of the Starchild label, released "A Cruel Angel's Thesis" as the theme song for Neon Genesis Evangelion (1995), and the song's popularity led to audiences outside of anime fans to recognize it. Among others, voice actors such as Hekiru Shiina, Mariko Kouda, and Megumi Hayashibara were also active in singing in addition to voice acting. Some voice actors also formed their own groups and perform theme songs to other anime series, such as Minami Takayama with Two-Mix.

2000-present: Voice actor boom

As more late-night anime series were being produced in the 2000s, Yui Horie, Yukari Tamura, and Nana Mizuki, who were signed with King Records, were produced and marketed as idol singers and voice actors by the record label. During the mid-2000s, there was a "voice actor boom", in addition to a period known as the "Idol Warring Period", a phenomenon named after a rapid growth in the idol industry. Mizuki's "Eternal Blaze" reached #2 on the Oricon Weekly Single Charts in 2005, and shortly after, the release of "Hare Hare Yukai" in 2006 led to the "Haruhi boom" mainly because of the animated dance sequence in the show's ending. In the following years, there was a substantial increase of voice actors in anime, and anime songs as a whole became more widely known to the general public. The anime song industry shifted to recruit young girls who were able to have an "idol" presence, naming Riisa Naka, Koharu Kusumi, and Aya Hirano as examples.

In 2010, Ho-kago Tea Time, a fictional band from the series K-On!, became the first anime characters to receive simultaneous #1 and #2 rankings on the Oricon Weekly Singles Chart with the release of both their singles. In the following years, idol-themed multimedia projects, such as Love Live!, The Idolmaster, and Uta no Prince-sama, became popular. Billboard Japan launched the Billboard Japan Hot Animation Chart on December 1, 2010 exclusively for anime and video game music releases.

Derivatives

The anime song genre became the direct influence of genres such as denpa song and  song.

Media

Record labels

The following record labels are exclusively for anime song music:

 Animex
 Flying Dog
 King Amusement Creative (formerly Starchild)
 Lantis
 Mages (formerly 5pb Records)
 Sacra Music
 Toho Animation Record

Concerts

 Animelo Summer Live
  (King Amusement Creative)

Artists

Performers

This is a list of singers and bands who primarily perform anime songs, including groups created from media mix anime projects. This list does not count singers or bands who release incidental songs for the genre, nor group names that the voice actors are credited under solely for performing the theme songs in the anime they are starring in.

Soloists

 Eir Aoi
 Shouta Aoi
 Kana Hanazawa
 Megumi Hayashibara
 Yui Horie
 Sōichirō Hoshi
 Miyu Irino
 Kanako Itō
 Hironobu Kageyama
 LiSA
 May'n
 Inori Minase
 Mamoru Miyano
 Nana Mizuki
 Hiroko Moriguchi
 Megumi Nakajima
 Yui Ogura
 Machico
 Masami Okui
 Daisuke Ono
 Soma Saito
 Maaya Sakamoto
 Minori Suzuki
 Yoko Takahashi
 Yukari Tamura
 Haruka Tomatsu
 Nao Toyama
 Maaya Uchida
 Yuma Uchida
 Sumire Uesaka
 Kōji Wada
 Zaq

Groups

 Ali Project
 Aqours
 Angela
 ClariS
 Dialogue
 Egoist
 Garnidelia
 Granrodeo
 Iris
 JAM Project
 Mia Regina
 Oldcodex
 OxT
 Poppin'Party
 Roselia
 Trefle
 TrySail
 Walkure

Composers

This is a list of songwriters who primarily compose and produce anime songs. This list does not count composers who produce incidental releases for the genre.

 Aki Hata
 Arte Refact
 Elements Garden
 Noriyasu Agematsu
 
 Hidekazu Tanaka

See also

 Animax Anison Grand Prix

References

 
 
Japanese styles of music
1970s in Japanese music
20th-century music genres
J-pop